Cerconota congressella is a moth of the family Depressariidae. It is found in Brazil (Amazonas), Guyana and Bolivia.

References

Moths described in 1864
Cerconota